David Lee Pavlas (born August 12, 1962) is a former baseball pitcher who was born in Frankfurt, West Germany. He attended Rice University.

Career 
Pavlas was a 6'7", 180-pound pitcher. He was signed by the Chicago Cubs as an amateur free agent in 1984. A right-handed pitcher, he did exceptionally well in his first professional season, going 8–3 with a 2.62 ERA. His success simmered after the first pro season, but overall he had an impressive minor league career-impressive enough to be called up by the Cubs at the age of 28. He did well in his first stint in the major leagues, going 2–0 with a 2.11 ERA in 13 games.

Even with that, he found himself in the minors in 1991. He appeared in only one game that year, allowing 2 runs in one inning of work. After playing in the minors for the remainder of the 1992 season, he moved on to the Mexican League. He spent two years there before being signed by the New York Yankees as a replacement player in 1995. In 20 career games as a Yankee, his ERA was below 3.00. After his final game in the majors on September 29, 1996, he pitched in seven games for the Yomiuri Giants in 1997, then bounced around in the minors until 2001 before retiring.

External links

Pura Pelota (Venezuelan Winter League)

1962 births
Living people
American expatriate baseball players in Canada
American expatriate baseball players in Japan
American expatriate baseball players in Mexico
American expatriate baseball players in Taiwan
Brother Elephants players
Charros de Jalisco players
Chicago Cubs players
Columbus Clippers players
Diablos Rojos del México players
Edmonton Trappers players
Iowa Cubs players
Major League Baseball pitchers
Major League Baseball players from Germany
Mexican League baseball pitchers
Nashville Sounds players
New York Yankees players
Nippon Professional Baseball pitchers
Oklahoma City 89ers players
Peoria Chiefs players
Pittsfield Cubs players
Rice Owls baseball players
Rice University alumni
Sportspeople from Frankfurt
Tiburones de La Guaira players
American expatriate baseball players in Venezuela
Tigres de Aragua players
Tucson Sidewinders players
Tulsa Drillers players
Winston-Salem Spirits players
Yomiuri Giants players
Parma Baseball Club players
American expatriate baseball players in Italy